Pearl Street may refer to:

Pearl Street (Manhattan)
Pearl Street Station
Pearl Street (Albany, New York)
Pearl Street (Reading, Massachusetts)
Pearl Street School
Pearl Street (Cincinnati, Ohio)
Pearl Street Market
Pearl Street (Boulder, Colorado)
Pearl Street Mall

See also
Pearl Street Historic District (disambiguation)
Pearl Street Schoolhouse